True Swing Golf (also known as Nintendo Touch Golf: Birdie Challenge in PAL regions, and 大人のDSゴルフ (Otona no DS Golf; DS Golf for Adults) in Japan) is a golf video game by long-time golf game creators T&E Soft, published by Nintendo and released for the Nintendo DS handheld video game system.

Modes of play 
The game features four separate modes of play: Stroke Play, where the player embarks on any courses unlocked in the game; Match Play, where the player engages in a matchplay against a computer opponent of a chosen difficulty level; Free Round, where the player is free to take on any hole on any particular course he has already unlocked; Championship, where the player progresses through a series of tournaments in order to unlock other courses and progress through the ranks, from a Rookie to a Junior, then Senior and finally Master.

Other features 
The game also features a Golf Shop which sells golfing equipment (separated into clubsets, golf balls and golf shoes), and, depending on the player's progress in the Championship, restocks its inventories with more advanced equipment until the player has completed the Masters Level Championship.

Despite it being named as a realistic golf game, players could utilise their clubset's skills to power up their shots, deliver more spin to the ball, or curve the ball more, which would decrease a Power Meter that gradually charges up over time as a player advances through the golf course.

There are a total of fifteen courses to unlock, the last three which are essentially extremely windy versions of the first three courses the player would encounter in the game.

Wireless play 
Only Stroke Play and Match Play nine holes are available if played through the DS Download function; otherwise, another game mode known as Skins Match is also available for play when all the players have a copy of the game.

Regional differences 
The Japanese version has a built-in illustrated glossary of golf terminology, which is missing from the Western releases.

DSiWare release 
'True Swing Golf Express' (North America) and 'A Little Bit of...Nintendo Touch Golf' (PAL regions) was released following other re-release titles for the DSiWare download service. 

The DSiWare version of the game does not include any Wi-Fi features, such as Local/Download Play or the in-game PictoChat function. It also features far less courses than the retail game. 

However, it adds several unique features:

 includes an updated and improved version of the game engine
 higher framerate due do the increased CPU speed of the Nintendo DSi 
 a more refined user interface
 improved, interactive Tutorial
 Challenge mode (replaces Championship Tour of the retail game)

Challenge Mode 
This adds a lot to the game and provides a method of increasing your player stats and unlocking additional courses. It includes 100 challenges at each of several different difficulty levels, totalling over 300 different challenges. They include such variations as:

 nearest to the pin
 chip-in
 limited strokes
 single putt
 total distance
 limited time
 competition (vs CPU)
 limited clubs

Trivia 
 Two of the players in the championship are called Miyamoto and Iwata, named after Shigeru Miyamoto and Satoru Iwata respectively.
 It is one of the games branded as Touch! Generations in North America.

Reception 

The DSi version received "favorable" reviews, while the original DS version received "average" reviews according to video game review aggregator Metacritic.

On release week, Famitsu gave the game a score of 30 out of 40.

References

External links 
 
 Game.net Page

2005 video games
Golf video games
Nintendo DS games
Nintendo DS-only games
DSiWare games
T&E Soft games
Touch! Generations
Video games developed in Japan